St Michael-at-Plea, Norwich is a Grade I listed redundant parish church in the Church of England in Norwich.

History

The church is medieval. The church was restored in 1887 when a partition separating the chancel from the nave was removed, and new windows were inserted in the Transepts. The box pews were replaced with chairs and the angels in the roof were gilded.

Organ

The church purchased an organ dating from 1887 by Norman and Beard. A specification of the organ can be found on the National Pipe Organ Register.

Present use

At present it is a bookshop and café.

References

External link

Michael
Grade I listed buildings in Norfolk